The men's light heavyweight event was part of the boxing programme at the 1936 Summer Olympics. The weight class was the second-heaviest contested, and allowed boxers of up to 175 pounds (79.4 kilograms). The competition was held from Monday, August 10, 1936 to Saturday, August 15, 1936. Twenty-one boxers from 21 nations competed.

Medalists

Results

References

External links
Official Olympic Report
 

Light heavyweight